Scrubbing In is an American reality television series that aired on MTV from October 24 until December 26, 2013. It chronicles a group of travel nurses who relocated from across the United States to Orange County, California, where they work in a hospital together. The series premiere acquired 673,000 viewers.

The show was cancelled after one season.

References

2010s American reality television series
2013 American television series debuts
2013 American television series endings
English-language television shows
Television shows set in Orange County, California
Nursing in the United States
MTV original programming